Khairuddin Haseeb (August 1929 – 12 March 2021) was an Iraqi journalist, academic, and politician. He had served as President of the  since its inception in 1975.

Biography
Haseeb was born in Mosul in August 1929. His father died 15 days after his birth, and he was raised by his grandfather, who was Wajih of the region. His grandfather died when Haseeb finished his secondary studies. He then attended the London School of Economics and earned a doctorate in public finance from the University of Cambridge.

Upon his return to Iraq, Haseeb began working for the Ministry of Oil, helping replace many foreigners who held influence over the Iraq National Oil Company. However, he was imprisoned in 1968, held between four different prisons over the course of four years. He was released in 1972 and became a professor at the University of Baghdad.

Khairuddin Haseeb died in Beirut on 12 March 2021 at the age of 91.

References

1929 births
2021 deaths
Iraqi journalists
Iraqi educators
Iraqi politicians
Alumni of the University of Cambridge
Academic staff of the University of Baghdad
People from Mosul
Governors of the Central Bank of Iraq